Charles Aitken (1869–1936) was an English art administrator.

Charles or Charlie Aitken may also refer to:

Charlie Aitken (footballer, born 1932) (1932–2008), Scottish footballer (Motherwell)
Charlie Aitken (footballer, born 1942), Scottish footballer (Aston Villa)